Dervish Pasha could refer to the following Ottoman statesmen:

Darwish Pasha (governor of Damascus), governor of Damascus in 1571–1574
Dervish Mehmed Pasha the Bosnian, grand vizier under Ahmed I (1606)
Koca Dervish Mehmed Pasha, grand vizier under Mehmed IV (1653–54)
Darwish Pasha al-Kurji, governor of Sidon, Karaman and Damascus (1770–1784)
Moralı Dervish Mehmed Pasha, who held office under Abdülhamid I (1775–77) on List of Ottoman Grand Viziers
Burdurlu Dervish Mehmed Pasha, who held office under Mahmud II (1818–20), see List of Ottoman Grand Viziers